Terry Gay (born 18 January 1947) is  a former Australian rules footballer who played with Hawthorn in the Victorian Football League (VFL).

Notes

External links 		
		
			
		
		
Living people		
1947 births		
		
Australian rules footballers from Victoria (Australia)		
Hawthorn Football Club players